The Somali sparrow (Passer castanopterus) is a species of bird in the family Passeridae found in  Somaliland, Djibouti, Ethiopia and Kenya.

It is considered a superspecies with the russet sparrow (Passer rutilans) and sometimes is even treated as the same species. However, the similarities in plumage and morphology between the two seem to represent convergent evolution rather than a single lineage.

Two subspecies are recognized:
 P. c. castanopterus Blyth, 1855 – Djibouti, Somaliland, and eastern Ethiopia
 P. c. fulgens Friedmann, 1931 – southern Ethiopia, and northern Kenya (south to Kapedo and Marsabit).

References

Somali sparrow
Birds of East Africa
Somali sparrow
Somali sparrow